It's You or No One (subtitled Dexter In Radioland Vol. 6) is a live album by American saxophonist Dexter Gordon recorded at the Jazzhus Montmartre in Copenhagen, Denmark in 1964 by Danmarks Radio and released on the SteepleChase label in 1983.

Critical reception 

AllMusic critic Scott Yanow stated "He performs extended versions of four standards with creativity and the music is quite enjoyable, recommended to bop fans".

Track listing 
 Introduction by Dexter Gordon – 0:21
 "Just Friends" (John Klenner, Sam M. Lewis) – 12:09
 "Three O'Clock in the Morning" (Julián Robledo, Dorothy Terriss) – 12:27
 "Where Are You?" (Jimmy McHugh, Harold Adamson) – 9:44
 "It's You or No One" (Sammy Cahn, Jule Styne) – 14:47

Source:

Personnel 
Dexter Gordon – tenor saxophone
Tete Montoliu – piano
Niels-Henning Ørsted Pedersen – bass
Alex Riel – drums

Source:

References 

SteepleChase Records live albums
Dexter Gordon live albums
1983 live albums
Albums recorded at Jazzhus Montmartre